José Milla y Vidaurre (August 4, 1822 in Guatemala City, First Mexican Empire — Guatemala City, Guatemala September 30, 1882) was a notable Guatemalan writer of the 19th century. He was also known by the name Pepe Milla and the pseudonym Salomé Jil. Son of a governor of the state of Honduras in the Federal Republic of Central America, José Justo de la Milla y Pineda and Mrs. Mercedes Vidaurre Molina, the daughter of a wealthy Guatemalan family.
He was married to his cousin, Mercedes Vidaurre and had 7 daughters and sons.

Milla grew up in a time of great instability, where the struggles between liberals and conservatives were bringing chaos to Guatemala. He came from a well-to-do family and was not a politically relevant figure. However, it is known that he had conservative tendencies and came to public office under conservative governments.

His works can be qualified under various literary genres, although they were mainly dedicated to story-telling, novels and more specifically historical novels. His main theme was life in the colonial Guatemala. His "novelas costumbristas" are about the customs of Guatemalan people during colonial times and during the first years after Guatemalan independence.

In his works, he shows an ability for story-telling and imagination. For him, one of the main functions of literature was to entertain and his books are examples of such function. Jose Milla was well-educated, an expert of Guatemalan idiosyncrasies, its history and its customs.

Works

 Don Bonifacio (narrative poem)
 La Hija del Adelantado (novel), 1866
 Los Nazarenos (novel)
 El Visitador (novel)
 Un viaje al otro mundo pasando por otras partes (Volumes 1 & 2)
 Memorias de un abogado (novel)
 El esclavo de don dinero (novel)
 Historia de un Pepe (novel)
 El canasto del sastre (cuadros de costumbres)
 Libro sin nombre
 Historia de la America Central (Volumes 1 & 2)

References

Bibliography

Milla y Vidaurre works

External links
Literature and art of Guatemala (in Spanish)
 

1822 births
1882 deaths
People from Guatemala City
Guatemalan novelists
Guatemalan male writers
Male novelists
Historical novelists
Guatemalan politicians
Rafael Carrera
19th-century Guatemalan writers
19th-century novelists
19th-century male writers